Blue Dart Express is an Indian logistics company that provides courier delivery services. It is headquartered in Mumbai, Maharashtra. It has a subsidiary cargo airline, Blue Dart Aviation that operates in South Asian countries. In 2002, Blue Dart had a business alliance with DHL Express and on 8 November 2004, DHL Express invested €120 million in it, and since then has been a major shareholder in the company.

History
Blue Dart was founded by Tushar Jani (chairman) and his friends Khushroo Dubash and Clyde Cooper in November 1983. In its early years, Blue Dart had a business agreement with Gelco Express International, UK, for the operations of international air package express services from India.

In 2010–11, it introduced ′cash on delivery (COD)′ to its customers as an additional payment option for its courier services.

See also 
 Courier in India
 Indian Postal Service
 DTDC, a courier service in India
 Ekart, a courier service in India
 Delhivery, an Indian logistics company

References

External links

DHL
Express mail
Logistics companies of India
Indian companies established in 1983
Transport companies established in 1983
Indian brands
Companies based in Mumbai
1983 establishments in Maharashtra
Companies listed on the National Stock Exchange of India
Companies listed on the Bombay Stock Exchange